Oxytropis is a genus of plants in the legume family. It is one of three genera of plants known as locoweeds, and are notorious for being toxic to grazing animals. The other locoweed genus is the closely related Astragalus. There are about 600 species, native to Eurasia and North America. Several species are native to the Arctic. These are hairy perennial plants which produce raceme inflorescences of pink, purple, white, or yellow flowers which are generally pea-like but have distinctive sharply beaked keels. The stems are leafless, the leaves being all basal. The plant produces legume pods containing the seeds.

Selected species

Oxytropis arctica – Arctic locoweed
Oxytropis bellii
Oxytropis borealis – boreal locoweed
Oxytropis campestris – field locoweed
Oxytropis deflexa – nodding locoweed
Oxytropis halleri – purple oxytropis
Oxytropis jacquinii
Oxytropis kobukensis – Kobuk locoweed
Oxytropis lambertii – purple locoweed
Oxytropis monticola – yellow-flowered locoweed
Oxytropis nitens 
Oxytropis ocrensis
Oxytropis oreophila – mountain oxytrope
Oxytropis oxyphylla
Oxytropis parryi – Parry's locoweed
Oxytropis pilosa
Oxytropis podocarpa – stalkpod locoweed
Oxytropis prenja
Oxytropis prostrata
Oxytropis pseudoglandulosa
Oxytropis riparia – Oxus locoweed
Oxytropis sericea – white locoweed
Oxytropis sordida
Oxytropis strobilacea
Oxytropis todomoshiriensis

References

External links

Jepson Manual Treatment
USDA Plants Profile

 
Fabaceae genera